Justyna Kozdryk (born 4 March 1980) is a Polish powerlifter who won silver at the 2008 Summer Paralympics.

References 

1980 births
Living people
Polish female weightlifters
Paralympic powerlifters of Poland
Powerlifters at the 2008 Summer Paralympics
Powerlifters at the 2012 Summer Paralympics
Powerlifters at the 2016 Summer Paralympics
Paralympic silver medalists for Poland
People from Grójec
Sportspeople from Masovian Voivodeship
Medalists at the 2008 Summer Paralympics
Paralympic medalists in powerlifting
Powerlifters at the 2020 Summer Paralympics
Medalists at the 2020 Summer Paralympics
Paralympic bronze medalists for Poland
20th-century Polish women
21st-century Polish women